Oberea octava is a species of beetle in the family Cerambycidae. It was described by Bernhard Schwarzer in 1927.

Subspecies
 Oberea octava octava Schwarzer, 1927
 Oberea octava kuchingensis Breuning, 1962

References

Beetles described in 1927
octava